Jack Kao (born 23 April 1958) is a Taiwanese actor.

Career
He began his career in the late 1980s films of Hou Hsiao-hsien.  Kao credits his success to the many real-life gangsters he knew when he was young.  He appeared in City of Sadness, a film about Taiwan's White Terror, which received the 1989 Golden Lion award the Venice Film Festival.  Another of his films about that same period, 2009's Prince of Tears, was also included in the festival.  His 2001 film Millennium Mambo was featured in the Film Society of Lincoln Center's 2016 retrospective "Going Steadi: 40 Years of Steadicam".

Selected filmography

Daughter of the Nile (1987) - Lin Hsiao-fang, the brother
Rouge of The North (1988)
A City of Sadness (1989) - Wen Leung
Mudan niao (1990)
Island of Fire (1990) - Ho
Wawa (1991)
Dust of Angels (1992)
Wu hu si hai (1992) - Fan Yat Wai
Treasure Island (1993)
Sheng nu de yu wang (1993)
What Price Survival (1994) - Jie
In The Heat of Summer (1994)
Dian zhi bing bing: Qing nian gan tan (1994) - Chan Wei-Cheng
Hao nan hao nu (1995) - Ah Wei
Yi qian ling yi ye zhi meng zhong ren (1995) - Kwok Ping-Tak
Te jing ji xian feng (1995) - Jiang Tian
Modern Republic (1995)
Goodbye South, Goodbye (1996) - Kao
Go do gaai bei (1997) - Zang
Flowers of Shanghai (1998) - Luo
Du xia 1999 (1998) - Ma Kau Wan
The Return of the Condor Heroes (1998, TV Series) - Golden Wheel Monk (1998)
Sing yuet tung wa (1999) - Gene
Xiang si chen xianzai (2000) - Jie
Time and Tide (2000) - Police Officer
Millennium Mambo (2001) - Jack
Tai Bei wan 9 zao 5 (2002) - Brother Jack
Moon Child (2003)
Yau doh lung fu bong (2004) - Mona's Dad
Gu lian hua (2005)
Lian ren (2005)
Ai li si de jing zi (2005)
Liu lang shen gou ren (2007) - Yellow Bull
Parking (2008)
Shinjuku Incident (2009)
Crazy Racer (2009)
The Sniper (2009) - Barber
Feng kuang de sai che (2009)
Ghosted (2009) - Chen Fu
Xin Su shi jian (2009) - Gao Jie
Sun cheung sau (2009) - Tao
Ba... ni hao ma (2009) - Father (segment "Wish")
Lei wangzi (2009) - Ah-Chang
Yi xi zhi di (2009) - Master Lin
Au Revoir Taipei (2010) - Kai's father
Lie yan (2010) - Editor
Red Nights (2010) - Mister Ko
Wo, 19 sui (2010)
 (2011) - Chou Wei-te's father (segment "Reverberation")
Dian Na Chà (2011)
Flying Swords of Dragon Gate (2011) - Tartar
Coming Back (2011)
Bad Girls (2012) - Matthew
Zombie-108 (2012) - Swat Commander
Good-for-Nothing Heros (2012)
Anywhere Somewhere Nowhere (2012)
Witness (2012) - Lao Song
Black & White (2012)
Taipei Factory (2013) - (segment "Mr. Chang's New Address")
Scandals (2013)
Unbeatable (2013) - Lin Yuan Xiang
My Lucky Star (2013) - Mr. Gao
The Break-Up Artist (2014) - Hsieh Chun-Tang
But Always (2014) - Anran's Father
Zombie Fight Club (2014) - Wu Ming (Teacher / Prison Warden)
The Crossing (2014)
One Night in Taipei (2015)
Two Thumbs Up (2015) - Warden
Massagist (2015) - Chia-Ching
The Unbearable Lightness of Inspector Fan (2015)
Lion Dancing 2 (2015)
Wild City (2015) - King
The Crossing (2015)
The Assassin (2015)
Inside or Outside (2016)
Spicy Hot in Love (2016) - Song Ming
Meng xiang he huo ren (2016)
One Night Only (2016) - Barth
Jing xin po (2016) - Ben Lam
Tian ma (2016) - Mai Zhongren
Shaowu the Bad (2017) - Keiko
Missing Johnny (2017) - Uncle Jiao
Jing Cheng 81 hao 2 (2017) - Ji Chunlong
Two Wrongs Make a Right (2017) - Qin Rui's father
Tian sheng bu dui (2017) - Qin Kwai
Jiao tou 2: Wang zhe zai qi (2018) - President Gui
Cities of Last Things (2018)
Project Gutenberg (2018) - Thai General
Song of the Assassins (2018)
Kuang tu (2018) - Chen Mu
Pegasus: On the Brink (2018)
The Big Shot (2019)
Han Dan (2019) - Hsieh Chun-Hao
Gang of Bra (2019)
The Longest Shot (2019)

References

External links

1958 births
Living people
Taiwanese Buddhists
20th-century Taiwanese male actors
21st-century Taiwanese male actors
Taiwanese male film actors